Mike Starchuk is a Canadian politician who was elected to the Legislative Assembly of British Columbia in the 2020 British Columbia general election. He represents the electoral district of Surrey-Cloverdale as a member of the British Columbia New Democratic Party.

Political career 
Starchuk was a member of Surrey City Council until 2018, elected at the 2014 British Columbia municipal elections as a member of Surrey First.

Electoral record

Provincial elections

Municipal elections 
Top 8 candidates elected - Incumbents marked with "(X)"

References 

Living people
British Columbia New Democratic Party MLAs
Surrey, British Columbia city councillors
21st-century Canadian politicians
Year of birth missing (living people)